Lote is a village in the municipality of Stad in Vestland county, Norway. The population of Lote (2001) was 132. The  Lote Tunnel is a tunnel along the European route E39 that goes through a mountain north of Lote. The tunnel connects Lote with the rest of Stad municipality.

History

Starting in 1838, Lote was administratively a part of the municipality of Gloppen, despite being separated from the rest of Gloppen by the Nordfjorden. On 1 January 1992, the Lote area was transferred to the municipality of Eid (now Stad Municipality). At that time Lote had 158 inhabitants. Lote is still connected to the municipality of Gloppen by a car ferry.

Transportation
The European route E39 highway passes through the village of Lote as it travels north toward Nordfjordeid. Going south from Lote on E39, there is a ferry service which crosses the Nordfjorden.

References

Villages in Vestland
Stad, Norway